Chutipol Thongthae (born January 23, 1991) is a Thai professional footballer who plays as a midfielder for Thai League 1 club Buriram United and the Thailand national team.

International career

He represented Thailand U23 in the 2013 Southeast Asian Games.On 6 June 2017, he made the debut for Thailand in the friendly match against Uzbekistan.

Honours

International
Thailand
 King's Cup (1): 2017
Thailand U-23
 Sea Games
  Gold Medal (1); 2013

Clubs
Buriram United
 Thai League 1: 2021-22
 Thai FA Cup: 2021–22
 Thai League Cup: 2021–22

External links

 Profile  at Goal

1991 births
Living people
Chutipol Thongthae
Chutipol Thongthae
Association football midfielders
Chutipol Thongthae
Chutipol Thongthae
Chutipol Thongthae
Chutipol Thongthae
Chutipol Thongthae
Chutipol Thongthae
Southeast Asian Games medalists in football
Chutipol Thongthae
Competitors at the 2013 Southeast Asian Games